Kelso High School may refer to:

 Kelso High School, Scotland
 Kelso High School (Washington), United States
 Kelso High Campus (formerly Kelso High School), New South Wales, Australia

See also
 Kelso (disambiguation)